Bangaarada Panjara is a 1974 Indian Kannada-language comedy film directed by debutant V. Somashekhar and co-produced by actor Raja Shankar. It starred Dr. Rajkumar in the lead role along with Aarathi, K. S. Ashwath, Pandari Bai and Lokanath. The movie saw a theatrical run of 25 weeks.

The core plot of the movie is based on the Marathi play Ekta Jeev Sadashiv which had already been adapted into a 1972 Marathi movie Ekta Jeev Sadashiv starring Dada Kondke. The 2000 Hindi movie Jis Desh Mein Ganga Rehta Hain is based on the Marathi movie and this movie.

Plot 
Beera is an innocent,  young shepherd who loves his parents Nanjamma and Junjappa. One day Janaki, a middle aged woman comes to Beera's village with her husband and brother. It is revealed that Janaki is the biological mother of Beera and that Nanjamma and Junjappa were childless, raised Beera like their own son. Janaki asks Nanjamma and Junjappa to hand over their son back to her.  They reluctantly agree and Beera is forcefully taken to a sophisticated house in Bangalore where he has 2 elder brothers,  sisters-in-law and a younger brother. Everything in the house is new to him including the sophisticated way of living,  food, even household equipments.  Many comical incidents take place when Beera begins to explore things in the new house and the city. He also discovers his brother's illegitimate affair with a woman.  Beera undergoes emotional turmoil due to the contrast manners and way of dealing things in the city. Unable to tolerate this, he finally returns to his foster parents and marries Mallamma whom he liked in the village.

Cast 

 Dr. Rajkumar as Beera
 Aarathi as Mallamma
 M. V. Rajamma as Nanjamma, Beera's Foster Mother
 K. S. Ashwath as Junjappa, Beera's Foster Father
 Pandari Bai as Janaki, Beera's Biological Mother
 Lokanath
 Balakrishna
 Shivaram
 Shani Mahadevappa
 Vajramuni
 Thoogudeepa Srinivas
 Shakti Prasad 
 Bindu as Reshma
 B. Jaya
 Vaishali Kasaravalli as Pallavi
 Shylashri as Seema
 Raja Shankar

Soundtrack 
The music of the film was composed by G. K. Raghu with lyrics for the soundtrack penned by Chi. Udaya Shankar.

Track list

References

External links 
 

1974 films
1970s Kannada-language films
Indian comedy films
Films directed by V. Somashekhar
1974 comedy films
Kannada films remade in other languages